Manuela Zürcher is a Swiss football midfielder currently playing in the Nationalliga A for FC Zürich, with which she has also played the Champions League. She was a member of the Swiss national team from 1999 to 2004.

References

1982 births
Living people
Swiss women's footballers
Switzerland women's international footballers
FC Zürich Frauen players
Swiss Women's Super League players
Women's association football midfielders